Lah Meleh-ye Olya-ye Jowkar (also Romanized as Lah Meleh-ye ‘Olyā-ye Jowkār) is a village in Margown Rural District, Margown District, Boyer-Ahmad County, Kohgiluyeh and Boyer-Ahmad Province, Iran. At the 2006 census, its population was 77, in 14 families.

References 

Populated places in Boyer-Ahmad County